Perlinella is a genus of common stoneflies in the family Perlidae. There are at least three described species in Perlinella.

Species
These three species belong to the genus Perlinella:
 Perlinella drymo (Newman, 1839) (striped stone)
 Perlinella ephyre (Newman, 1839) (vernal stone)
 Perlinella zwicki Kondratieff, Kirchner & Stewart, 1988

References

Further reading

External links

 

Perlidae
Articles created by Qbugbot